This article presents top ten lists of female singles tennis players, as ranked by various official and non-official ranking authorities throughout the history of the sport.

The article is split into two sections: 1921–1974, and since 1975 when the first official WTA rankings were published, for ease of navigation.

Top ten rankings by year

1921–1974

1975 

The official WTA rankings were introduced in November 1975.

1976

1977

1978

1979

1980

1981

1982

1983

1984

1985

1986

1987

1988

1989 

Last Tingay ranking before his death.

1990

1991

1992

1993

1994

1995

1996

1997

1998

1999

2000

2001

2002

2003

2004

2005

2006

2007

2008

2009

2010

2011

2012

2013

2014

2015

2016

2017

2018

2019

2020

2021

2022

See also 
 World number 1 ranked female tennis players
 List of WTA number 1 ranked singles tennis players
 Top ten ranked male tennis players
 Top ten ranked male tennis players (1912–1972)

References 

Women's tennis
10
10